Dandelion Records was a British record label started on 18 July 1969 by the British DJ John Peel.

History
The label was started as a way to get the music Peel liked onto record. Peel was responsible for "artistic direction" and the commercial side was handled by Clive Selwood of Elektra Records and his wife Shirley. Peel wrote: 

Dandelion and the sister publishing company Biscuit were named after Peel's hamsters at the suggestion of his then flatmate Marc Bolan.

Around twenty eight albums were released by the label. One album was by Gene Vincent, with a cast of musicians including members of The Byrds and Steppenwolf. Others were by younger or non-commercial artists, including Beau, Bridget St John, Medicine Head, Clifford T. Ward, David Bedford, Lol Coxhill, Stack Waddy, Tractor, Kevin Coyne/Siren, and Denmark's Burnin' Red Ivanhoe.

The only record ever to make the UK Singles Chart was "(And The) Pictures in the Sky" by Medicine Head, which reached #22 in 1971. Beau's "1917 Revolution" made #1 in the Lebanon in 1969.

Dandelion Records were distributed by, successively, CBS Records, Warner Bros. Records and Polydor. The label ran until late 1972 when it started to try to place its artists with other labels as its distribution via Polydor had ceased. It had issued about a dozen singles and two dozen albums. Several releases attracted a cult audience but never quite crossed into the mainstream, although one of the last singles, Clifford T. Ward's 'Coathanger', from his debut album 'Singer Songwriter', attracted a certain amount of airplay on Radio 1. Both Tractor and Medicine Head appeared fairly high in various album charts- Medicine Head would go on to appear on Top of the Pops and Tractor would get heavily involved in the hippy festival circuit which they still make rare appearances on to this day.  As Peel himself told Record Collector in 1994, 'when you can't afford full-page ads in the music press, artists become very resentful...there's no faster way of losing friends.'

One of the most curious albums issued by the label was a sampler, There is Some Fun Going Forward.

Most Dandelion recordings have been reissued on vinyl and/or CD. A batch of half a dozen came out on CD on Repertoire Records in the early 1990s, followed by the whole catalogue as two-on-one CDs by See For Miles Records in the mid-1990s.

Individual albums have been licensed around the world, with major catalogue releases since 2005 on Cherry Red Records in the UK and Airmail Archive Recordings in Japan. Cherry Red acquired the entire catalogue of original Dandelion Records recordings (excluding Tractor / The Way We Live) in September 2009. The UK trade mark Dandelion Records and its Dandelion flower logo are the intellectual property of Ozit Morpheus Records who have released new recordings under the Dandelion Records brand.

The Dandelion Records by Tractor and The Way We Live were reissued in the 2000s by Ozit Morpheus Records, as was a six-hour DVD about John Peel and some of the artists on Dandelion Records. This was released as a tribute to John in November 2008. It includes a contribution from his wife Sheila Ravenscroft.

Discography

Albums
63750:	Bridget St John – Ask Me No Questions			
S63751: Beau – Beau
63752:	Principal Edwards Magic Theatre – Soundtrack			
63753:	Occasional Word Ensemble – The Year of the Great Leap Sideways
63754:	Gene Vincent – I'm Back and I'm Proud	
63755:	Siren – Siren
63756: Mike Hart – Mike Hart Bleeds
63757:	Medicine Head – New Bottles Old Medicine			
DAN8001/K49001: Siren – Strange Locomotion
DAN8002/K49002: Principal Edwards Magic Theatre – The Asomoto Running Band
DAN8003/K49003: Stack Waddy – Stack Waddy
DAN8004/K49004: The Way We Live – A Candle for Judith	
DAN8005/K49005: Medicine Head – Heavy on the Drum
DAN8006/K49006: Beau – Creation (With The Way We Live)
DAN8007/K49007: Bridget St John – Songs for the Gentle Man
DSD8008/K69001: Lol Coxhill – Ear of Beholder
2310145: Burnin' Red Ivanhoe – WWW
2310146: Supersister – To the Highest Bidder
2310165: David Bedford – Nurses Song with Elephants
2310166: Medicine Head – Dark Side of the Moon		
2310193: Bridget St John – Thank You For
2310211: Mike Hart – Basher Chalky Pongo and Me (as Mike Hart & the Comrades)		
2310216: Clifford T. Ward – Singer Songwriter
2310217: Tractor – Tractor		
2310228: Kevin Coyne – Case History (1972)
2310231: Stack Waddy – Bugger Off!
2485021: Various artists – There is Some Fun Going Forward (sampler album)

Singles
4403: Beau – "1917 Revolution" / "Sleeping Town"
4404: Bridget St John – "To B Without A Hitch" / "Autumn Lullaby"
4405: Principal Edwards Magic Theatre – "Ballad of the Big Girl Now" / "Lament for Earth"
4493: Clague	- "Mandy Lee" / "Bottle Up and Go" (With Kevin Coyne)
4494: Coyne-Clague – "The Stride" / "I Wonder Where"
S 4596: Gene Vincent – "Be-Bop-A-Lula '69" / "Ruby Baby"
4661: Medicine Head – "His Guiding Hand" / "This Love of Old"
4781: Mike Hart – "Yawney Morning Song" / "Almost Liverpool 8"
4786: Bill Oddie – "On Ilkla Moor Baht 'at" / "Harry Krishna"
S 4974: Gene Vincent – "White Lightning" / "Scarlet Ribbons (For Her Hair)"
S 5075: Medicine Head – "Coast to Coast" / "All for Tomorrow"
S 5119: Stack Waddy – "Roadrunner" / "Kentucky"
DAN7002/K19004: Siren – "Strange Locomotion" / "I'm All Aching"			
DAN7003/K19002: Medicine Head – "(And The) Pictures in the Sky" / "Natural Sight"
DAN7004/K19003: Yamasukis – "Yamasuki" / "Aieaoa"
2001276: Medicine Head – "Kum On" / "On the Land"			
2001282: Tractor – "Stoney Glory" / "Marie" / "As You Say"	
2001325: Medicine Head – "Only To Do What Is True" / "Sittin' in the Sun"
2001327: Clifford T. Ward – "Carrie" / "Sidetrack"	
2001331: Stack Waddy – "You Really Got Me" / "Willie the Pimp"			
2001357: Kevin Coyne – "Cheat Me" / "Flowering Cherry"			
2001382: Clifford T Ward – "Coathanger" / "Rayne"	
2001383: Medicine Head – "How Does It Feel" / "Morning Light"
2058214: Coxhill Bedford Duo – "Mood" / "Sonny Boy" / "Oh Mein Papa" (B-side by Will Dandy & the Dandylettes)

See also
 Lists of record labels

References

Bibliography

External links
 The original John Peel's Dandelion Label site
 a detailed site on Dandelion Records

British record labels
Record labels established in 1969
Record labels disestablished in 1972
Alternative rock record labels
John Peel